Gamba or Gambas may refer to:

Geography
Gamba, Gabon, a port
Gamba Airport in Gamba, Gabon
Gamba, Chad, a town
Gamba County, Tibet

People
Gamba (surname)
Gamba (footballer) (Carlos Alberto Gambarotta; 1893–1944), Brazilian footballer

Other uses
Viol, any of a family of stringed musical instruments, informally called a gamba
Gamba di Pernice or Gamba rossa, a variety of grape
Gamba Osaka, Japanese football team
Gambas (Spanish "prawns") programming language
Gamba, title character of the Japanese anime series Gamba no Bōken
 "Gamba", a song by Brockhampton from Saturation II
Gamba grass (Andropogon gayanus)
Gamba, the Hebrew word for a red Bell pepper